The Tokai American Football Association (東海学生アメリカンフットボール連盟) (sometimes stylized as the "ToKai") is an American college football league made up of colleges and universities in the Tōkai region of Japan.

Overview
The League was founded in 1975.

Member schools

Block 1

Block 2

League champions

References

External links
  (Japanese)

American football in Japan
American football leagues
College athletics conferences in Japan
1975 establishments in Japan
Sports leagues established in 1975